Zarudny is a surname. Notable people with the surname include:

Alexander Zarudny (1863-1934), Russian lawyer and politician
Nikolai Zarudny (1859–1919), Ukrainian-Russian explorer and zoologist
Ivan Zarudny (late 17th/early 18th c.), Ukrainian wood-carver and icon-painter

See also
Samiilo Bohdanovych-Zarudny (17th c.), Cossack diplomat, noble and general judge